Shisha, sheesha, or Shisheh may refer to:
 Mu‘assel or shisha tobacco, the molasses-based tobacco product heated in a hookah
 Hookah lounge, or shisha bar
 Hookah also known as waterpipe, the heated tobacco product or the device used to smoke it

Other uses
 Sheesha (1986 film), directed by Basu Chatterji
 Sheesha (2005 film), a film directed by Ashu Trikha
 "Shisha" (song), a song by Massari
 Taivoan people, also Shisha, a Taiwanese indigenous people
 Shisha (embroidery), or mirror-work, an embroidery technique used to attach small mirrors to cloth
Shesha 2022 film by muzammil mustafa

See also
 Shisa, a type of Japanese statue derived from Chinese guardian lions